Mullah Ghani served briefly as the Taliban-appointed governor of Nimruz Province, Afghanistan in 1995.  Ghani was culturally similar to his predecessor, Hamidullah Niyazmand.  Ghani was removed from power when Jamaat forces counter-attacked the capital city of Zaranj later in 1995.

References

Governors of Nimruz Province
Taliban governors
2014 deaths
Pashtun people
Year of birth unknown